Governor Anderson may refer to:

C. Elmer Anderson (1912–1998), 28th Governor of Minnesota
Charles Anderson (governor) (1814–1895), 27th Governor of Ohio
Forrest H. Anderson (1913–1989), 17th Governor of Montana
George William Anderson (1791–1857), 10th Governor of British Ceylon
Hugh J. Anderson (1801–1881), 20th Governor of Maine
John Anderson (colonial administrator) (1858–1918), 22nd Governor of British Ceylon and 16th Governor of Straits Settlements
John Anderson Jr. (1917–2014), 36th Governor of Kansas
John Anderson (New Jersey politician) (1665–1736), Acting Royal Governor of New Jersey
John Anderson, 1st Viscount Waverley (1882–1958), Governor of Bengal from 1932 to 1937
Kenneth Anderson (British Army officer) (1891–1959), Governor of Gibraltar
Sigurd Anderson (1904–1990), 19th Governor of South Dakota
Victor Emanuel Anderson (1902–1962), 28th Governor of Nebraska
Wendell R. Anderson (1933–2016), 33rd Governor of Minnesota

See also
Elmer L. Andersen (1909–2004), 30th Governor of Minnesota